Crassochaeta is a genus of fungi within the Chaetosphaerellaceae family.

Species
As accepted by Species Fungorum;
 Crassochaeta fusispora 
 Crassochaeta nigrita

References

External links

Sordariomycetes genera
Coronophorales